Zachary John Quinto (born June 2, 1977) is an American actor and film producer. He is known for his roles as Sylar, the primary antagonist from the science fiction drama series Heroes (2006–2010); Spock in the film Star Trek (2009) and its sequels Star Trek Into Darkness (2013) and Star Trek Beyond (2016); Charlie Manx in the AMC series NOS4A2, and Dr. Oliver Thredson in American Horror Story: Asylum,  for which he received a nomination for an Emmy award. His other starring  film roles include Margin Call (2011), Hitman: Agent 47 (2015), Snowden (2016), and Hotel Artemis (2018). He also appeared in smaller roles on television series, such as So Notorious, The Slap, and 24, and on stage in Angels in America, The Glass Menagerie, and Smokefall.

Early life
Zachary John Quinto was born in Pittsburgh, Pennsylvania to Margaret "Margo" (née McArdle), who worked at an investment firm and later at a magistrate's office, and Joseph John "Joe" Quinto, a barber. He was raised in the suburb of Green Tree, Pennsylvania and attended Saints Simon and Jude Catholic School (closed 2010). His father died of cancer when Quinto was seven years old, and Quinto and his brother, Joe, were subsequently raised by their mother. Quinto's maternal great-grandfather was the labor activist and Republican Pittsburgh City Councilman Peter J. McArdle, whom Pittsburgh's P.J. McArdle Roadway is named after. His maternal grandfather was Joseph A. McArdle, a Democratic member of the U.S. House of Representatives.

Quinto was raised Catholic. His father was of Italian descent, while his mother was of Irish ancestry. Quinto graduated from Central Catholic High School in 1995, where he participated in its musicals and won the Gene Kelly Award for Best Supporting Actor, and then attended Carnegie Mellon University's School of Drama, from which he graduated in 1999.

Career
Quinto first appeared on television in the short-lived television series The Others, and appeared as a guest star on shows including CSI, Touched by an Angel, Charmed, Six Feet Under, Lizzie McGuire, and L.A. Dragnet. In 2003, during the theatrical run of Endgame by Samuel Beckett, directed by Kristina Lloyd at the Odyssey Theatre in Los Angeles playing the role of Clov, he landed a recurring role as computer expert Adam Kaufman on the Fox series 24; Quinto appeared in 23 episodes of the third season.

In 2006, Quinto played the role of Sasan: the haughty, bisexual Iranian-American best friend of Tori Spelling on her VH1 series So NoTORIous. Later that year, he joined the cast of Heroes as Gabriel Gray, better known as the serial killer Sylar. He worked on the series until its cancellation in 2010 after four seasons.

His casting as a young Spock in the J. J. Abrams-directed reboot of the Star Trek film franchise was officially announced at the 2007 Comic-Con. Speaking alongside Leonard Nimoy at a press conference to promote the first new Star Trek film, Quinto revealed that Nimoy had been given casting approval over who would play the role of the young Spock. "For me Leonard's involvement was only liberating, frankly," says Quinto. "I knew that he had approval over the actor that would play young Spock, so when I got the role I knew from the beginning it was with his blessing."

In a September 2008 interview, Abrams said of Quinto's performance as Spock: "Zachary brought a gravity and an incredible sense of humor, which is a wonderful combination because Spock's character is deceivingly complicated. The revelation for me watching the movie, when I finally got to watch the whole thing after working on sequences, was that he is extraordinary. He was doing things I didn't even realize while we were shooting – these amazing things to track his story." Quinto also made references to Star Trek's historical record for diversity and inclusiveness in its casting and storylines.

After Star Trek, he appeared in the comedy short Boutonniere (2009). It  "...was a movie written and directed by my former landlady and friend, [actress Coley Sohn]. She called up and said, 'Would you do me a favor and be in my short film?

In 2008, Quinto joined with Corey Moosa and Neal Dodson to form Before the Door Pictures. The company produced projects in film, television, new media, and published two graphic novels in a deal with comic book publisher Archaia Entertainment: they published a graphic novel called Mr. Murder is Dead, created by writer Victor Quinaz, closely followed by LUCID: A Matthew Dee Adventure written by writer/actor Michael McMillian.

Quinto also starred in several comedy shorts. He played a strangely lovable kidnapper in "Hostage: A Love Story", written by the comedy duo HoltandSteele, for Before the Door Pictures and Funny or Die. He also played a prospective dog adopter (based on Quinto's own experience) in "Dog Eat Dog", written and directed by Sian Heder, and premiered at the Los Angeles Film Festival in 2012.

Quinto has also kept up his theatre experience, which includes roles in a variety of productions, including classics such as Samuel Beckett's Endgame at the Los Angeles Odyssey Theatres in 2003, Shakespeare's Much Ado About Nothing at the Los Angeles Shakespeare Festival and Intelligent Design of Jenny Chow at the Old Globe Theatre. From October 2010 to February 2011, Quinto played the lead role of Louis Ironson in an Off-Broadway revival of Tony Kushner's Angels in America at the Signature Theatre, New York City. For this role, Quinto received the Theatreworld Outstanding Debut Performance award.

In 2013, Quinto played the role of Tom Wingfield in the American Repertory Theatre's production of The Glass Menagerie by Tennessee Williams. He was also in the Broadway reprisal of the production, in 2014.  In February 2016, Zachary appeared in the New York premiere of MCC Theater's Smokefall.

In 2010, Quinto's company Before the Door Pictures produced Margin Call, an independent film about the financial crisis of 2007–08. Quinto played the role of Peter Sullivan in the film, in a cast that included Jeremy Irons, Kevin Spacey, Paul Bettany, Stanley Tucci, Penn Badgley and Demi Moore. Margin Call premiered in January 2011 at the Sundance Film Festival. Margin Call received an Oscar nomination for Best Original Screenplay, by J. C. Chandor. Quinto was an executive producer for Chandor's next film All Is Lost (2013) with Robert Redford as the sole actor.

In October 2011, Quinto began a recurring role on the FX series American Horror Story as Chad, former owner of the house. Quinto returned for the second season in one of the lead roles, as Dr. Oliver Thredson.  In 2014, Quinto and his Before the Door partners produced a Chris Moore project, The Chair, a documentary series on Starz that shows the process of two directors bringing their first feature to the screen. In 2015, Quinto was a guest on the acclaimed TV series Girls and Hannibal.

Movie-wise, Quinto reprised his role of Spock in Star Trek Into Darkness in 2013 and in Star Trek Beyond, released in 2016. In addition, he played John Smith in Hitman: Agent 47 in 2015. At the other end of the spectrum from the action-oriented Agent 47, Quinto appeared opposite James Franco in the drama I Am Michael (2015), a film that premiered at the Sundance Film Festival. In 2016, he portrayed journalist Glenn Greenwald in the Edward Snowden biopic Snowden, narrated, as space scientist Pascal Lee, in the documentary film Passage to Mars, and appeared as himself in the documentary film For the Love of Spock. In 2018, he starred in the Broadway play The Boys in the Band.

In 2016, science fiction author John Scalzi released a novella, The Dispatcher, created specifically for Audible; Quinto narrated the story, as well as the second book in the series, Murder by Other Means. He also starred with Michelle Buteau in the Audible scripted podcast. Sorry Charlie Miller. 

Quinto has modeled for magazines including GQ and August.

Personal life
Quinto publicly came out as gay in October 2011. He explained that, after the suicide of gay teenager Jamey Rodemeyer, he felt that "living a gay life without publicly acknowledging it is simply not enough to make any significant contribution to the immense work that lies ahead on the road to complete equality." Prior to his coming out, Quinto had long been an active supporter of gay rights and organizations, including The Trevor Project. In 2009, he appeared in the one-night production Standing on Ceremony: The Gay Marriage Plays, a benefit stage reading in response to the passing of Proposition 8, as well as in the play The Laramie Project: 10 Years Later, about the 1998 murder of Matthew Shepard. In 2010, Quinto contributed a video to the It Gets Better Project, an Internet-based campaign that aims to prevent suicide among LGBTQAI+ youth. In 2012 Quinto campaigned on behalf of Barack Obama, including appearing in the video Obama Pride: LGBT Americans For Obama.

From 2010 to 2013, Quinto was in a relationship with actor Jonathan Groff. Quinto began dating model and musician Miles McMillan in the summer of 2013. In early 2015, the couple moved into a NoHo, Manhattan apartment they purchased together. In November 2015 Vogue'' magazine called them "a power couple whose domain extends across the film, fashion, and art scene." The two ended their relationship in early 2019.

In 2017, Quinto criticized the timing of actor Kevin Spacey's decision to come out as part of his response to allegations of sexual advances towards then-14-year-old actor Anthony Rapp.  He called the manner of Spacey's announcement "deeply sad and troubling," feeling he had not stood up "as a point of pride — in the light of all his many awards and accomplishments — thus inspiring tens of thousands of struggling LGBTQ kids around the world," but instead as "a calculated manipulation to deflect attention from the very serious accusation that he attempted to molest one."

Filmography

Film

Television

Stage

Video games

Awards and nominations

See also

 LGBT culture in New York City
 List of LGBT people from New York City

References

External links

 
 

1977 births
Living people
20th-century American male actors
21st-century American male actors
Activists from Pennsylvania
American film producers
American male film actors
American male television actors
American male stage actors
American people of Irish descent
American people of Italian descent
Carnegie Mellon University College of Fine Arts alumni
American gay actors
LGBT people from Pennsylvania
LGBT producers
American LGBT rights activists
Male actors from Pittsburgh
Theatre World Award winners
Central Catholic High School (Pittsburgh) alumni